The 1926–27 Irish Cup was the 47th edition of the premier knock-out cup competition in Northern Irish football. 

Ards won the tournament for the 1st time, defeating Cliftonville 3–2 in the final at The Oval.

Results

First round

|}

Quarter-finals

|}

Semi-finals

|}

Final

References

External links
 Northern Ireland Cup Finals. Rec.Sport.Soccer Statistics Foundation (RSSSF)

Irish Cup seasons
1926–27 domestic association football cups
1926–27 in Northern Ireland association football